Rosanna Chichester (born 1989) is a beauty pageant titleholder who was crowned Miss British Virgin Islands 2013 and represented British Virgin Islands at Miss World 2014.

Early life
Rosanna is the First Caribbean International Bank employee. She is also a Dance Teacher at the New Testament Church of God.

She is also a volunteer for the Family Support Network and the BVI Cancer Society.

Pageantry

Miss British Virgin Islands 2013
Rosanna Chichester was crowned Miss British Virgin Islands 2013 at the Multi-Purpose Sports Complex in Road Town on 4 August. Miss Chichester blew away the audience and obviously the judges and walked away with nearly all of the individual prizes including for Miss Poise, Miss Popularity, Best BVI Promotion, Best Swim Wear, Best Cultural Costume, Best Evening Wear and Miss Intellect.

Miss World 2014
Rosanna competed at Miss World 2014 in London but was unplaced.

References

External links
https://web.archive.org/web/20120226135315/http://www.missbvi.com/ Official Miss British Virgin Islands website

1989 births
British Virgin Islands beauty pageant winners
Living people
Texas Christian University alumni
Miss World 2014 delegates